Paul Laurence Dunbar High School is a historically black public secondary school located in Washington, D.C. The school was America's first public high school for black students.

The school is located in the Truxton Circle neighborhood of Northwest Washington, two blocks from the intersection of New Jersey and New York avenues. Dunbar, which serves grades 9 through 12, is a part of the District of Columbia Public Schools.

From the early 20th century to the 1950s, Dunbar became known as the classical academic high school for black students in segregated public schools. As all public school teachers were federal civil servants, the school's teachers received pay equal to white teachers in other schools in the district. It attracted high-quality faculty, many with advanced degrees, including doctorates. Parents sent their children to the school from across the city because of its high standards. Many of its alumni graduated from top-quality colleges and universities and gained professional degrees.

History
The school was founded in 1870 by William Syphax, President of the Board of Trustees for Colored Schools, as the Preparatory High School for Colored Youth. The school was started at the Fifteenth Street Presbyterian Church. From 1891 to 1916, it became known as M Street High School. The school was America's first public high school for black students. When its location was changed from M Street, the school was renamed in 1916 for the noted African-American poet, Paul Laurence Dunbar, who died in 1906.

As the city established other high schools, it designated Dunbar as its academic high school, with other schools providing more vocational or technical training. Dunbar was known for its excellent academics, enough so that some black parents moved to Washington specifically so their children could attend it. All the public school teachers were federal employees, and Dunbar's faculty was paid well by the standards of the time, earning parity pay with Washington's white school teachers. The school boasted many graduates who went on to higher education and a generally successful student body.

Dunbar's original 1916 building, designed by architect Snowden Ashford, was demolished in 1977 and subsequently rebuilt; the resulting building was in turn demolished and rebuilt in 2013.

In the 21st century, Dunbar is similar to Paul Laurence Dunbar High School in Baltimore, Maryland and Fort Worth, Texas, as all three schools have a majority African-American student body and are of major importance to the local African-American community. All three schools are also highly regarded for their athletic programs within their respective school district in football, basketball, and track. There is also a Paul Laurence Dunbar High School in Lexington, Kentucky.

One of Dunbar's first principals in Washington, D.C., was the first black graduate of Harvard College. Almost all the teachers had graduate degrees, and several earned PhDs. By the 1950s, Dunbar High School sent 80 percent of its students to college.

According to economist Thomas Sowell's 2015 appraisal, this all changed after the landmark United States Supreme Court Case Brown v. Board of Education that ruled for integration of public schools: 
"For Washington, the end of racial segregation led to a political compromise, in which all schools became neighborhood schools. Dunbar, which had been accepting outstanding black students from anywhere in the city, could now accept only students from the rough ghetto neighborhood in which it was located. Virtually overnight, Dunbar became a typical ghetto school. As unmotivated, unruly and disruptive students flooded in, Dunbar teachers began moving out and many retired. More than 80 years of academic excellence simply vanished into thin air."

Since its inception, the school has graduated many well-known figures of the 20th century, including Sterling Brown, H. Naylor Fitzhugh, Nannie Helen Burroughs, Charles R. Drew, William H. Hastie, Charles Hamilton Houston, Robert Heberton Terrell, Benjamin O. Davis Jr., Paul Capel, III, Robert C. Weaver, and James E. Bowman. Its illustrious faculty included Anna Julia Cooper, Kelly Miller, Mary Church Terrell, A. A. Birch Jr., Carter G. Woodson, and Julia Evangeline Brooks, who was also a graduate of the school. Among its principals were Anna J. Cooper, Richard Greener, Mary Jane Patterson, and Robert Heberton Terrell. An unusual number of teachers and principals held Ph.D. degrees, including historian Carter G. Woodson, the second African American to earn a PhD from Harvard (after W. E. B. Du Bois) and the father of 'Black History Month'.

Until 1954, Fairfax County, Virginia, had no secondary schools for black students. Dunbar and several other District of Columbia public schools accepted black students from the county before that time.

Admissions 
Dunbar has about 650 students.
 98% are African American
 1% are Hispanic American
 Less than 1% are Asian American
 Less than 1% are Native American
 Less than 1% are European American

Approximately 46% of students qualified for free or reduced lunch.

Feeder patterns
Feeder elementary schools include:
 J. F. Cook
 Emery
 Langdon
 Marshall
 Terrel
 Webb
 Wheatley
 Young

Feeder middle schools include:
 Browne

Feeder K-8 schools include:
 Walker-Jones Education Center

Notable alumni

Artists and musicians
 Elizabeth Catlett, a prominent sculptor and artist.
 George Faison, Tony and Emmy Award-winning choreographer, dancer and producer
 May Miller, playwright
 Billy Taylor, jazz pianist
 Vantile Whitfield, influential arts administrator and theater director

Athletes
 Arrelious Benn, NFL wide receiver for the Jacksonville Jaguars
 Nate Bussey, NFL linebacker in the NFL and CFL
 Josh Cribbs, NFL player
 Vernon Davis, NFL tight end for the Washington Redskins
 Vontae Davis, retired NFL cornerback who played for the Miami Dolphins, Indianapolis Colts, and Buffalo Bills
 John Duren, NBA player and 19th overall pick in the 1980 NBA Draft by the Utah Jazz
 Cornelius Greene, All-American and first African American quarterback to start at Ohio State University
 Anthony Jones, former basketball player for Georgetown Univ and UNLV. Jones was selected in the first round by the Washington Bullets in the 1986 NBA Draft. Also played for the Spurs, Bulls, and Mavericks.
Wil Jones, a record-setting basketball player at American University and head basketball coach of University of the District of Columbia National Champions, Division II, 1982.
 Tre Kelley, former basketball player for the University of South Carolina
 Bernard Robinson, retired NBA player.
 Craig Shelton, retired NBA player.
 Michael Smith, NBA Smith was selected by the Sacramento Kings in the second round of the 1994 NBA Draft. He would play for the Kings, Vancouver Grizzlies, and Washington Wizards.

Government
 Mary Burke Washington (1944), economist and government official
 Wesley A. Brown, first African-American graduate of the US Naval Academy.
 Frederic E. Davison, first African-American major general in the army.
 Edward Brooke, first African American to be elected by popular vote to the United States Senate.
 Lawrence Chambers, first African-American graduate of the U.S. Naval Academy to reach the rank of admiral.
 Walter Fauntroy, first delegate to the U.S. House of Representatives from the District of Columbia's at-large congressional district
 Vincent C. Gray, former chairman of the Council of the District of Columbia and mayor of Washington D.C.
 Eleanor Holmes Norton (1955), Delegate to Congress.
 Clarence M. Pendleton Jr., chairman of the United States Commission on Civil Rights from 1981 until his death in 1988 
 Inez Smith Reid, judge of the District of Columbia Court of Appeals
 Antoinette Scott, nurse and soldier who is the first female from Washington, D.C., to receive the Purple Heart. DC
 Annice M. Wagner, judge of the District of Columbia Court of Appeals

Scholars and professionals

 James E. Bowman, scientist, physician, pathologist, studied G6PD and Sickle cell disease
 Sterling Allen Brown, professor, poet
 Allison Davis (1920), anthropologist, educator, scholar; first African American to hold full faculty position at a major white institution, namely, University of Chicago
 John Aubrey Davis Sr. Civil rights activist, head academic researcher on Brown v. The Board of Education, New Negro Alliance co-founder and political science professor
 Enid Cook de Rodaniche, virologist and bacteriologist. She was the Chief of the Public Health Laboratory at the Instituto Conmemorativo Gorgas in Panama City, Panama.
 Charles R. Drew (1922), discovered blood plasma and was the first black surgeon to serve as an examiner on the American Board of Surgery
 H. Naylor Fitzhugh, credited with creating the concept of target marketing
 Evelyn Boyd Granville, second African-American woman to receive a Ph.D. in mathematics from an American university
 Roland Jefferson, first African American botanist employed by the United States National Arboretum
 Dolores Kendrick, second Poet Laureate of the District of Columbia
 Colbert I. King, Pulitzer Prize-winning The Washington Post columnist
Edna Burke Jackson, first African American woman to teach at Woodrow Wilson High School
Oscar James Cooper, co-founder of Omega Psi Phi Fraternity Inc.

Criminals
 Rayful Edmond, drug kingpin

Notable faculty 

 G. David Houston, former professor of English at Howard University
Jane Eleanor Datcher, first African American woman to earn an advanced degree from Cornell University
Ernest Everett Just, renowned zoologist and honorary founder of Omega Psi Phi Fraternity Inc.
Carter G. Woodson, father of Negro History Week, later Black History Month.

References

External links

 

Public high schools in Washington, D.C.
District of Columbia Public Schools
Historically segregated African-American schools in Washington, D.C.
African-American history of Washington, D.C.